"Two of Hearts" is a song by American singer Stacey Q, first issued as an independent 12-inch dance club single by On the Spot Records, then picked up by Atlantic after achieving regional sales. Written by John Mitchell, the song was Stacey Q's biggest hit; its global sales success fueled the recording of her debut album Better Than Heaven (1986), which included the song. 

Musically, "Two of Hearts" is a hi-NRG song. It utilizes vocal sampling with the repetitive usage of the line "I need you" in its hook. The song's lyrics revolve around love and romance. "Two of Hearts" received positive reviews from music critics and was a commercial success around the globe. It entered the US Billboard Hot 100 in mid-July 1986, breaking into the top 40 in mid-August and peaking at number three during the autumn of that same year to become one of the highest-selling singles of 1986. "Two of Hearts" was ranked number 27 on VH1's "100 Greatest One Hit Wonders of the '80s", although follow-up single "We Connect" was a minor hit on the Hot 100 (peaking at #35). 

The accompanying music video for "Two of Hearts" was directed by Peter Lippman. It depicts Stacey Q dancing in front of a white background in various outfits and performing at a nightclub. "Two of Hearts" has been covered by a number of artists and has appeared in feature films such as Nowhere, Little Nicky, Party Monster, and Hot Rod (where it was done to punchdance). It is also the title character's ringtone in the TV series The Flight Attendant.  Stacey Q also performed the song on a season eight episode of The Facts Of Life.

Background and recording
After the release of the album Playback (1983) with the band SSQ, Stacey Q began working with Jon St. James on her solo material. St. James brought her the song "Two of Hearts," suggesting that she record it. At first, Stacey Q refused to record a song written by someone else, but later she changed her mind. The single was co-produced by St. James who owned the recording studio, William Walker, and nightclub deejay Jeff Fishman. The artist and producers promoted the single, especially to Latin music audiences in Los Angeles and Miami. The song was picked up by Atlantic Records to be released as the lead single from Q's debut studio album Better Than Heaven (1986). They recorded the album in three weeks while the song was climbing the charts.

The song was prominently featured in the Facts of Life episode "Off-Broadway Baby" in which Stacey Q appeared as the character Cinnamon, a teenage singer largely modeled on herself; the episode ends with her performing the song in a radio station's sound booth.

Cover versions and sampling
 Japanese singer Yōko Nagayama covered the song in Japanese in her 1986 album Venus.
 Vietnamese singer Ngoc Tuyet covered the song, but titled "Đoi Tim Nong Say" in the fall of 1986.
 British DJ and producer Jakatta sampled the spoken word section from 'Two of Hearts' in his 2001 single 'American Dreams'
 Kelly Osbourne's cover of the song appears as a bonus track on the Japanese edition of her 2005 album Sleeping in the Nothing.
 Brad Walsh released a version in 2006.
 Purple Crush released a version in 2007.
 In 2007, the Korean pop group Wonder Girls sampled "Two of Hearts" in their single "Tell Me", produced by JYP Entertainment.
 Norwegian singer Annie covered the song in 2008.
 Akina Nakamori covered the song in her 2017 cover album Cage.
 The “I need you” is parodied and covered in a Burger King commercial which sings “I need big king, I need two.”

Track listings

US 7-inch single (On the Spot Records)
"Two of Hearts" (7" Version) – 3:33
"Shy Girl" – 3:43

US 12-inch single (On the Spot Records)
"Two of Hearts" (European Mix) – 7:29
"Two of Hearts" (Dance Mix) – 6:00
"Two of Hearts" (Radio Edit) – 3:45
"Stacey's Dream (A Capella) – 2:35

US 7-inch single (Atlantic Records)
"Two of Hearts" (Radio Edit) – 3:58
"Dancing Nowhere" – 3:43

US 12-inch single (Atlantic Records)
"Two of Hearts" (Vocal / European Dance Mix) – 6:00
"Two of Hearts" (Instrumental) – 4:39
"Two of Hearts" (Vocal / Radio Edit) – 3:58
"Stacey's Dream (A Capella) – 2:32

Credits and personnel
 Stacey Q – vocals
 Jon St. James – production, keyboards
 Rich West – keyboards
 Skip Hahn – keyboards
 Karl Moet – drums
 Jeff C. Fishman – associate production
 William J. Walker – associate production
 Lester Cohen – photography

Charts

Weekly charts

Year-end charts

References

1986 singles
1986 songs
Atlantic Records singles
RPM Top Singles number-one singles
Stacey Q songs